"Ties of Blood and Water" is an episode of the syndicated American science fiction television series Star Trek: Deep Space Nine, the nineteenth episode of the fifth season.

Set in the 24th century, the series follows the adventures of the crew of the space station Deep Space Nine near the planet Bajor, as the Bajorans recover from a decades-long occupation by the imperialistic Cardassians. The station is adjacent to a wormhole connecting Bajor to the distant Gamma Quadrant, which is home to an empire known as the Dominion; in the fifth season, the Dominion annexes Cardassia, fomenting new conflict with the United Federation of Planets. In this episode, the Bajoran Major Kira Nerys (Nana Visitor) copes with her feelings about the impending death of Tekeny Ghemor (Lawrence Pressman), a Cardassian dissident she has become close to, while Cardassia's new Dominion government attempts to co-opt his legacy.

Plot

Ghemor arrives at Deep Space Nine, having left Cardassia after his activities as a dissident became known. Kira hopes he will be the face of the resistance against the Dominion-controlled puppet government of Cardassia, but he tells her that he is dying. He wishes to participate in a Cardassian tradition in which a dying person reveals their secrets to the rest of the family for use against their enemies. He chooses Kira to interview him, since he regards her as family. Captain Sisko (Avery Brooks) encourages her to participate, as Ghemor's information could greatly aid the Federation and Bajor. Kira is hesitant at first, remembering the injuries that her father suffered at the Cardassians' hands during the occupation of Bajor. However, she agrees to hear Ghemor's secrets and use them for good.

Gul Dukat (Marc Alaimo), the head of Cardassia's Dominion government, requests Ghemor's extradition to Cardassia, but Sisko brusquely rejects him. Refusing to take no for an answer, Dukat and the his Dominion liaison Weyoun visit the station, intent on taking Ghemor with them. Dukat first offers to reunite Ghemor with his long-lost daughter, and then gives Kira information that incriminates Ghemor in a massacre at a Bajoran monastery. Finally he delivers a bottle of poisoned liquor to Ghemor's quarters, but Sisko intercepts it.

Kira becomes furious at Ghemor and spends as little time caring for him as possible. However, she later learns from security chief Odo that Ghemor was only nineteen at the time of the massacre, an inexperienced foot soldier. Kira recalls that when her own father was badly injured, she chose to participate in a counterattack rather than stay with him, and missed his death by minutes. Realizing that she is letting her own past bitterness taint her relationship with Ghemor, she returns to his bedside and stays until he dies. Dukat intends to tell the public that Ghemor praised the Dominion with his last words and wants to have the body returned to Cardassia for a military funeral. Sisko rejects the request and allows Kira to bury Ghemor on Bajor next to her father.

Continuity 

This episode is a sequel to the third season's "Second Skin", in which Kira met Ghemor and formed a bond with him as a result of a plot by the Cardassian intelligence agency in which he was made to believe she was his missing daughter. 

The episode marks the second appearance of Weyoun, a Vorta Dominion official played by Jeffrey Combs. Although Weyoun was killed in the episode "To The Death", the producers were impressed by the character, so the writers established in this episode that the Vorta were clones in order to bring back Combs in the role.

Reception 
In 2018, SyFy recommend this episode for its abbreviated watch guide for the Bajoran character Kira Nerys.
Tor.com gave it 6 out of 10.

References

External links

 

Star Trek: Deep Space Nine (season 5) episodes
1997 American television episodes
Television episodes directed by Avery Brooks